Orbital (also known as Orbital 2 or the Brown Album) is the second studio album by English electronic music duo Orbital, released on 24 May 1993 by Internal and FFRR Records. Like the duo's debut album, the album was officially untitled.

The album peaked at number 28 on the UK Albums Chart.

Album
On Orbital the duo aimed to make more atmospheric music than the dance raves of their first album. They used more complex rhythms and denser arrangements on the appropriately named pieces entitled "Lush" but still proving themselves capable of making quality pop music on "Halcyon + On + On", with vocals from Kirsty Hawkshaw of Opus III.

The album begins with "Time Becomes", which uses the same speech sample by the actor Michael Dorn in Star Trek: The Next Generation (Time squared - season 2 episode 13, Worf - 20'30 : "There is the theory of the Möbius. A twist in the fabric of space where time becomes a loop") which opened their first album. The piece uses phasing, a technique popularized by Steve Reich, in which two identical samples are repeated at slightly different speeds. The brothers enjoy aural puns, and the use of this sample again, as well as the muffled intro on "Planet of the Shapes" with intentional addition of record static and crackles, followed by the sound of a needle skipping grooves then scratching across the record, was meant to trick fans who bought the vinyl edition into thinking their copy was less than perfect.

The second song on the album, "Planet of the Shapes", contains a sample from the movie Withnail & I ("even a stopped clock gives the right time twice a day"). "Impact" samples a line from "a French film dubbed into English" with a "conspiracy, alien plot" that the band no longer remembers the name of.

Meat Beat Manifesto were an influence on the album, after Orbital toured with the group in the United States ahead of recording it. The breakbeat on "Impact" was provided by Jack Dangers and "Remind" is an instrumental re-recording of Orbital's "Mind the Bend the Mind" remix of "Mindstream" by Meat Beat Manifesto, which removed all elements of "Mindstream" from the piece. The remix and final work was inspired by the Fabio Paras remix of React 2 Rhythm's "I Know You Like It".

"Walk Now..." samples the sound of a Sydney zebra crossing alert and a didgeridoo, which were both recorded after a trip to Australia to perform at an illegal rave named Welcome 92.

Critical reception

The album received widespread acclaim. In the UK, NME praised the record, saying, "The techno album is a doughty brute to master. Only a few have managed it successfully [...] but Phil and Paul Hartnoll have done it twice... The expression 'intelligent ambience' is bandied around to describe spacey dance music with undue regularity, but Untitled actually satisfies the description. Scientific and terrific." Q also recognised that the duo had made a second successful album, saying, "Like their first album, Orbital's current effort is a finely balanced combination of muso trickery and astute dance tracks... Again, like the latter, it benefits from repeated listening." Select stated that "the marvel is that they create such vastness in your ear from micro-minimalist ingredients", and described the record as "infinitely inventive, unique in its conception and electronically sexy".

Melody Maker claimed that "This new album (untitled, like the first) puts them firmly back in the firmament". In a reference to the most talked about band at the time of the album's release, Suede and their sexually ambiguous frontman Brett Anderson, and including a pun on "Anarchy in the U.K.", the debut single by the Sex Pistols, the review concluded, "As warm as plasma and as eerie as ectoplasm, Orbital's (out-of-)body-music is the true sound of Androgyny-in-the-UK." Vox observed that "this collection sees Paul and Phil Hartnoll drifting still further into the heart of the machine, touching upon the sometimes fragile soul of Techno", before declaring that "Orbital are still leading the field".

Accolades
This album is included in the book 1001 Albums You Must Hear Before You Die alongside their 1994 LP Snivilisation. Along with 1996's In Sides, it was also included in Q magazine's "90 Best Albums of the 1990s". In 1996, Mixmag ranked the album at number nine in its list of the "50 Best Dance Albums of All Time". In 1999, Ned Raggett ranked the album at number 21 on his list of "The Top 136 or So Albums of the Nineties".

Track listing
 "Time Becomes" – 1:43
 "Planet of the Shapes" – 9:36
 "Lush 3-1" – 5:39
 "Lush 3-2" – 4:40
 "Impact (The Earth Is Burning)" – 10:27
 "Remind" – 7:57
 "Walk Now..." – 6:48
 "Monday" – 7:05
 "Halcyon + On + On" – 9:28
 "Input Out" – 2:11

On cassette, "Planet of the Shapes" was re-titled "Planet of the Tapes" and placed as the first song on side two, before "Walk Now..." in the track listing; the track is identical.

The title "Planet of the Shapes" is also a reference to the 1968 film Planet of the Apes.

Use in other media
"Halcyon + On + On" and parts of "Lush 3-2" were used in the 1995 Mortal Kombat film soundtrack. The 1995 movie Hackers also used the track "Halcyon + On + On". The ending of the movie Mean Girls uses the song "Halcyon + On + On" in the final scene.

References

External links
 
 

1993 albums
FFRR Records albums
Orbital (band) albums